Kauai County Fair or Kauai County Farm Fair is a fair held annually in Lihue, Hawaii, traditionally the largest Hawaiian fair of the year.
It is usually held in August, though in part of the 20th century it was held in April.

Frank Sinatra appeared at the Kauai County Fair in April 1952 at a time when his career had severely declined. It was raining at the time and the dilapidated tent he was in leaked during his first performance.

References

Fairs in the United States
Festivals in Hawaii
Tourist attractions in Kauai County, Hawaii